Tsim Sha Tsui Centre and Empire Centre are two office buildings and shopping malls in East Tsim Sha Tsui, Kowloon, Hong Kong. They are connected by a covered pedestrian bridge.

History
The Tsim Sha Tsui Centre was developed in 1980 by Sino Group, where the headquarters are now located. It was the first building built in East Tsim Sha Tsui. The architect of the building was Wong & Ouyang.

Access
They shopping malls are located near the East Tsim Sha Tsui station and the Star Ferry service to Hong Kong Island.

References

External links

 Official website of Tsim Sha Tsui Centre and Empire Centre

Shopping centres in Hong Kong
Sino Group
Tsim Sha Tsui East